Facheiroa squamosa is a species of Facheiroa from Brazil.

References

External links
 
 

squamosa
Flora of Brazil